The Hidden Stream Temple Cave ( also zhai fu tang) is cave number 20 at the Longmen Grottoes near Luoyang, Henan, China.

History
The cave had wooden structured eaves added in the Qing Dynasty, but these were not maintained.  In 1990 an outer room imitating the Tang style was rebuilt and the floor was paved with bricks.

Features
The central statue is a large Amitabha seated on a square pedestal with loose clothes, a naked chest and a plump face.  His hands take the abhaya mudra, symbolising fearlessness.  The bodhisattvas Avalokitesvara and Mahasthamaprapta stand to each side. Two armoured heavenly kings protect the entrance.

There are also two line engraved buddhas in a niche on the southern wall outside the cave.

References

Chinese Buddhist grottoes
Caves of Henan
Chinese architectural history
Archaeological sites in China
Chinese sculpture
Religion in Henan